El misterio de Huracán Ramírez (The Mystery of Hurricane Ramirez) is a 1962 black-and-white Mexican luchador film directed and co-written by Joselito Rodríguez. The film is a sequel to Rodríguez's 1952 film Huracán Ramírez, with David Silva reprising his role as Fernando Torres. Other returning cast members include Tonina Jackson, Carmelita González, Titina Romay and Freddy Fernández. Pepe Romay joins the cast as Fernando's son Pancho, and Daniel García makes his film début as Huracán Ramírez, replacing Spanish-born wrestler Eduardo Bonada, who would make only a cameo appearance.

Plot
The film continues the story of Fernando Torres, now seemingly retired from lucha libre, having sold his former identity to a rival luchador. The new Huracán has proved himself to be a savvy businessman, running his own wrestling arena. The lives of Huracán and the Torres family are soon threatened however, by a local gangster known as El Príncipe (Carlos Agosti), who will stop at nothing until he discovers the true identity of Huracán Ramírez.

Cast
David Silva as Fernando Torres: A retired wrestler who sold the Huracán Ramírez wrestling mask and character to someone else.
Daniel García was the man under the Huracán Ramírez mask in all of the action sequences. He would also play the role in wrestling rings all over Mexico for decades after the movie was released.
Tonina Jackson as Señor Torres/Tonina Jackson: Fernando's father
Carmelita González as Laura: Fernando's wife.
Freddy Fernández as Pichí: Laura's younger brother and Fernando's best friend.
Titina Romay as Margarita Torres: Fernando's little sister.

The film also featured a number of real-life luchadores wrestling with and against Huracán Ramírez in the action sequences.

External links

1962 films
Lucha libre films
1960s Spanish-language films
Mexican black-and-white films
Films directed by Joselito Rodríguez
1960s Mexican films